The 1983 Cricket World Cup was played in England on fifteen different venues. A total of 27 matches were played in 1983 Cricket World Cup including 2 Semifinals and a Final match.

Umpires
11 umpires were selected to supervise 27 matches of the World Cup. All of them belonged to the England.
The first semifinal was supervised by Don Oslear and David Evans while David Constant and Alan Whitehead supervised the second semifinal.

Dickie Bird was elected for the third time and Barrie Meyer for the second time to supervise a World Cup final.

References

External links

 Scorecards of all the 1983 World Cup matches
 Cricket World Cup 1983

Knockout stage
Sports competitions in England
1983 in cricket
1983 in English cricket

mr:१९७५ क्रिकेट विश्वचषक बाद फेरी